Zheng Tao may refer to:

 Zheng Tao (swimmer), Chinese para swimmer
 Zheng Tao (footballer), Chinese footballer